Louis Herman "Red" Klotz (October 21, 1920 – July 12, 2014) was an American professional basketball player. He was a National Basketball Association (NBA) point guard with the original Baltimore Bullets, and he was best known for forming the teams that play against and tour with the Harlem Globetrotters: the Washington Generals and the New York Nationals. He was the oldest-living NBA champion.

Over Klotz's professional basketball career, he coached or played in over 14,000 games during eight decades and in over 100 countries.

Early life
Klotz was born in Philadelphia, Pennsylvania, into a Jewish family. He began playing basketball at age 12. He attended South Philadelphia High School where he led the school team to city basketball championships in 1939 and 1940, both times earning Philadelphia Player of the Year honors.

He attended Villanova University on an athletic scholarship, playing on the undefeated freshman basketball team. He left college for World War II, serving stateside.

Career
Klotz "played for a number of teams in those early and turbulent days of professional basketball", according to Joe Posnanski of Sports Illustrated. Klotz played with the South Philadelphia Hebrew Association (the Philadelphia Sphas) of the American Basketball League (ABL) as a point guard in the 1940s. In an exhibition game, the Sphas defeated the Harlem Globetrotters , Klotz's first game against them. He played with the Sphas until 1947.

Klotz played during the 1948 season on the Baltimore Bullets team, the year they won the Basketball Association of America championship. He played in 11 games, scoring 15 points. He also played in six playoff games, scoring six points.

At , he is tied as the fourth-shortest person to play in an NBA game, and the shortest to play on a championship team.

Washington Generals
Klotz played for the Philadelphia Sphas of the ABL until 1947; the team had beaten the Harlem Globetrotters on more than one occasion. He later coached and managed the Sphas. In 1953, after playing on several all-star teams against the Trotters during their first international tours, Klotz was approached by Globetrotters owner Abe Saperstein about having his team tour with the Globetrotters and play them on a regular basis. Klotz named his new enterprise the Washington Generals, in honor of Dwight D. Eisenhower. From 1953 until 1995, the Generals played exhibitions against the Globetrotters, winning only two games and only one recognized by the Trotters, the last in 1971, and losing more than 14,000.

Klotz played with the team as a point guard until the age of 68. At 50 years old, he made the game-winning shot for the New Jersey Reds with three seconds left in their final win. "The crowd wanted to kill me," he said. In 1995 Klotz "disbanded" the Generals and formed the New York Nationals to take their place, to erase their record and "change their luck". The team remained the Nationals until 2007, when they reverted to the "Generals" name. The Generals remain a separate organization from the Globetrotters. Klotz claimed the team still tried to win every game.

Achievements
Klotz was inducted into the Philadelphia Jewish Sports Hall of Fame in 2001. He became the first non-Globetrotter to receive the Globetrotters' "Legend" award on March 10, 2007. Red has stated he has lost over 13,000 games in his coaching career.

In 2009 the Philadelphia Sportswriter's Association presented Klotz with the "Living Legend" award, previously given to such Philadelphia notables as Robin Roberts, Chuck Bednarik, Harry Kalas and Wilt Chamberlain.

The Globetrotters inducted Klotz into their Legends Ring, the team's version of a hall of fame, in 2007. He remains the first non-Trotter so honored. In 2011, the Trotters and Generals retired Klotz's number 3 jersey and raised a banner honoring him to the rafters at the Wells Fargo Center in Philadelphia.

Klotz's biography, The Legend of Red Klotz: How Basketball's Loss Leader Won Over the World, 14,000 Times, was published in November 2013.

Personal life
Klotz was married. He attributed much of his success to his wife, Gloria.

He died at age 93 in Margate City, New Jersey, where he had long kept his office.

BAA career statistics

Regular season

Playoffs

See also
List of select Jewish basketball players
List of shortest players in National Basketball Association history

References

External links

 Crothers, Tim. "The General Whose Army Never Wins," Sports Illustrated, February 20, 1995
 Branch, John. "When the Generals Lose to the Globetrotters, Everyone Wins," The New York Times, Friday, February 13, 2009
 "The Winningest Loser", South Jersey Magazine, June 2008.

1920 births
2014 deaths
American men's basketball coaches
American men's basketball players
Baltimore Bullets (1944–1954) players
Basketball coaches from Pennsylvania
Jewish American sportspeople
Jewish men's basketball players
People from Margate City, New Jersey 
Philadelphia Sphas players
Player-coaches
Point guards
Villanova Wildcats men's basketball players
Washington Generals players
Basketball players from Philadelphia
21st-century American Jews
South Philadelphia High School alumni